Isorropus sanguinolenta is a moth of the subfamily Arctiinae. It was described by Paul Mabille in 1878. It is found on Madagascar.

References

 

Lithosiini
Moths described in 1878
Taxa named by Paul Mabille